See What I Care is an EP by Norwegian band Datarock. It was released on 12 November 2007 by their record label, Young Aspiring Professionals.

Track listing
 "Not Me" – 3:35
 "Do It Your Way" – 1:50
 "See What I Care" – 3:19
 "Stay" – 2:26
 "New Rave Anthem" – 1:45
 "Fa Fa Fa (Shakes Remix)" – 4:22
 "Fa Fa Fa (Riton Turbo Disco Remix)" – 6:31
 "I Used To Dance With My Daddy (Para One Remix)" – 4:55
 "I Used To Dance With My Daddy (Mark Dynamix And Jaytech's Suger Daddy-O Remix)" – 5:26

2007 EPs
Datarock albums